Bianca Regina Lyttle Reyes-Abrenica (born August 3, 1990), professionally known as Sophie Albert, is a Filipino actress and television personality of European and Chinese descent. She joined the GMA Network in 2017.

Career

2010–2016: Early television career
Albert was one of the new talents launched by ABS-CBN's Star Magic in their Batch 15 in 2007, using the name Bianca Reyes. From a young age, it was already her dream to be an actress. She joined Star Magic without telling her parents because her mother did not wish for her to enter show business because she was still young and studying. This was also the reason why she left showbiz soon after.

In 2012, again without the knowledge of her parents, Albert joined the televised talent search Artista Academy of TV5. She became the competition's female grand winner, The Best Actress. Albert has mentioned that her winning the competition has convinced her mother of letting her re-enter and stay in the entertainment industry.

TV5's management suggested she use a screen name instead of her real name because of the abundance of Biancas and Reyeses already present in the Philippine showbiz world. "Albert" is her maternal grandmother's maiden name.

In 2013, her first project after her win was the drama series Never Say Goodbye, where she was paired with Best Actor Vin Abrenica. He later became her real-life boyfriend. They worked with Alice Dixson, Cesar Montano, Gardo Versoza and Nora Aunor.

One of her breakthrough projects after Artista Academy was the 2014 Cinemalaya movie #Y which later on won Special Citation for Ensemble Acting award. The film is a coming-of-age story that revolves around the lives of upper-class and modern-day youth, which the title reference to Generation Y, while the hashtag marks this generation known for their affinity with social media and technology, and combines this with a tale of teen suicide, sex, drugs, and alcohol, and the ideological lifestyle of YOLO.

In the same year, Albert and her Artista Academy co-finalists Chanel Morales and Stephanie Rowe were supposed to top-bill TV5’s adaptation of the hit American suspense series Pretty Little Liars. It was supposed to air in April 2014, but a rumor floated that the Pretty Little Liars adaptation was already shelved. Although TV5 denied the rumor, the project was never aired.

After this, Albert headlined a few episodes of TV5’s Wattpad Presents until she decided to return to ABS-CBN.

2017–present: Breakthrough with GMA Network
After asking to be released a few months early from her contract with TV5, Albert decided to become an actress without any home network. She did one project in ABS-CBN, the broadcast network and parent company of Star Magic, in an episode of Ipaglaban Mo. Soon after, in October 2017, Albert signed an exclusive contract with GMA Network and GMA Artist Center (now Sparkle). She has since gotten a steady stream of projects for years. 

She did supporting roles in teleseryes until 2018, when she was given the plum kontrabida role of Amber in the prime-time series Pamilya Roces.

2019 was a big year for Albert. She rose to stardom via her portrayal of main antagonist role Reign, a rich and evil concubine in the afternoon series Bihag who caused the kidnap of Ethan and Jessie’s misfortune, and was cast as the leading lady in the prime-time series The Gift.

She has since returned to acting albeit in episodic programs such as My Fantastic Pag-ibig and Daig Kayo Ng Lola Ko.

Personal life
Albert did not want it to be known to the public, but eventually it was found out that she is a member of the prominent Cojuangco family. Her paternal grandmother, Josephine C. Reyes, Ed.D, Ph.D, is the Chair of the Board of Trustees and 7th president of the Far Eastern University (FEU). She is the sister of former Filipino congressman José Cojuangco Jr., who served as the 9th President of the Philippine Olympic Committee (POC), and Corazon Aquino, former President of the Philippines. This means she is the niece of actress and equestrienne Mikee Cojuangco, former Filipino President Benigno Aquino III and actress and host Kris Aquino. Albert has mentioned that Mikee, in particular, was very supportive during her time on the talent show Artista Academy.

Albert has been dating actor Vin Abrenica since June 2013. The two had met the previous year as co-competitors on Artista Academy, which they both won. Albert and Abrenica initially ended their relationship in 2016, citing "personal and career-related problems", but reconciled in 2018. In December 2020, the couple became engaged. In February 2021, Albert revealed that she and Abrenica had moved in together. That same month, they announced that they were expecting their first child, a daughter. Their daughter was born on March 15, 2021. On January 25, 2023, they finally tied the knot on what could have been the 90th birthday of Albert's aunt Corazon Aquino.

Filmography

TV series

TV show

Reality show

Films

Music video appearances

References

External links 
 
 https://www.gmanetwork.com/sparkle/artists/sophiealbert

Living people
Filipino film actresses
Filipino television actresses
1990 births
GMA Network personalities
People from Mandaluyong
Actresses from Metro Manila
Star Magic personalities
Cojuangco family
Filipino people of Chinese descent
Filipino people of Spanish descent
Filipino people of Italian descent
Filipino people of Irish descent
Filipino people of Portuguese descent